Keith Varon is an American singer-songwriter, guitarist, and music producer from San Francisco, living in Los Angeles. Keith is signed to Pulse Music Group, and has been commercially releasing music over the past 10 years as a solo act and as a founding member in the band The Federal Empire.

As a songwriter/producer, Keith has written and produced songs on albums by Lauren Sanderson, Jacob Sartorius, Shaylen, Xuitcasecity and Nightly. In the electronic world, he has written/produced songs with Martin Garrix, Sam Feldt, Steve Aoki, and Max Styler.

Selected writing and production discography

External links
Pulse Music Group Biography

Year of birth missing (living people)
Living people
American pop musicians